Kristin Danielle Klabunde (born September 12, 1991 in New Jersey) is an American actress and singer.  She is mostly known as the singing voice of Tasha on the Nickelodeon animated preschool series The Backyardigans. She has had guest roles on television such as Saturday Night Live, As the World Turns, and Gilmore Girls.

Career on Broadway
On Broadway, she has played Molly in Annie, Young Cosette and Young Éponine in Les Misérables, and Annie in Annie. Off-Broadway, she has played Mary in The Secret Garden, Pearl in The Scarlet Letter, and Sarah Crew in A Little Princess.

Personal life
Klabunde volunteers at many charity events such as Kids with a Cause, Kids Helping Kids Charity, Children's Hope International Coalition, and Make a Wish Foundation. She currently lives in North Hollywood, California.

External links
 
 

1991 births
American child actresses
American child singers
Living people
21st-century American singers
21st-century American women